Green pit viper is a common name for several venomous snakes and may refer to:

Trimeresurus albolabris, native to southeastern Asia from India to China and Indonesia
Trimeresurus macrops, native to Thailand, Cambodia and Vietnam
Trimeresurus trigonocephalus, endemic to Sri Lanka
Trimeresurus salazar, native to India and named after Salazar Slytherin of the Harry Potter fantasy literature series.

References

Trimeresurus